The Canton of Betton is a canton of France, in the Ille-et-Vilaine département. At the French canton reorganisation which came into effect in March 2015, the canton was expanded from 4 to 6 communes:
Betton  
Cesson-Sévigné
La Chapelle-des-Fougeretz
Chevaigné
Montgermont
Saint-Grégoire

References

Cantons of Ille-et-Vilaine